The Cameroonian Football Federation is the governing body of football in Cameroon. It is known as FECAFOOT.

On 11 December 2021, the acting-President of FECAFOOT - former Cameroonian international striker, Samuel Eto'o Fil, was elected President of the organisation.

See also 
Cameroon national football team
Cameroon women's national football team

References

External links 
 Cameroon at the FIFA website.
  Cameroon at CAF Online

Cameroon
Football in Cameroon
Football
Sports organizations established in 1959